This article is a list of historic places in Albert County, New Brunswick entered on the Canadian Register of Historic Places, whether they are federal, provincial, or municipal.

List of historic places in albert county nb

See also

 List of historic places in New Brunswick
 List of National Historic Sites of Canada in New Brunswick

Albert County, New Brunswick